Nasser Yeganeh (4 June 1921 – 15 November 1993) was an Iranian jurist, politician and statesman. He served as Chief Justice of the Supreme Court, the head of the Iranian judiciary, brought in during Amir-Abbas Hoveyda's tenure.

Early life and education 
Yeganeh was born in 1921, to an aristocratic family in Qazvin. His father, Mirza Ghaffar Khan Yeganeh (more commonly known as Salar Mansour), was the Hakim (Governor) of Qazvin. Yeganeh attended primary and secondary school in Qazvin before going to the University of Tehran where he received a Bachelor of Laws. He then went to France to pursue a PhD in Public Law from the Sorbonne. Following his graduation, Yeganeh traveled to the United States where he studied the American judicial system.

Career
Yeganeh served as deputy in 1963. He was the minister of state (1963–1971), senator (1971–1974) and chief justice of the Supreme Court (1975–1979). He also served as the deputy prime minister in the cabinet led by Hassan Ali Mansur in the period between March 1964 and January 1965.

Death
Yeganeh fled to the United States following the Iranian revolution and on 15 November 1993 committed suicide on his boat in Washington, D.C.

References

External links

1921 births
1993 deaths
Iranian politicians who committed suicide
University of Tehran alumni
University of Paris alumni
Iran Novin Party politicians
Rastakhiz Party politicians
People from Qazvin
Chief justices of Iran
Iranian expatriates in France
Iranian expatriates in the United States
People of Pahlavi Iran